Croatia competed at the 2007 World Championships in Athletics with 4 athletes.

Competitors

Results

Nations at the 2007 World Championships in Athletics
World Championships in Athletics
2007 World Championships in Athletics